Roy Alexander Armstrong (14 January 1914 – 26 April 1991 ) was a member of the Queensland Legislative Assembly.

Biography
Armstrong was born in Warwick, Queensland, the son of Samuel John Armstrong and his wife Ann Isabel (née Hall) and was educated at Warwick State School. After finishing his schooling he was a timber cutter and haulier before working as a sugarcane farmer.

On 4 March 1940 he married Daphne Merle Bauld  and together had one son. Daphne died in 1976 and the following year he married Marie Veronica Diery (née Thornton) (died 2006). Armstrong died in Brisbane in April 1991 and was buried in Brisbane's Mt Gravatt Cemetery.

Public career
Armstrong started out in politics as a councilor on the Mulgrave Shire Council between 1956 and 1961.

He joined the Queensland Parliament as the Country Party member for Mulgrave following the death of Carlisle Wordsworth in 1960. He went on to represent the electorate for twenty years before retiring at the 1980 Queensland state election.

He was a person in the old Country Party mould. In 1972 the government, of which Armstrong was a member, nominated Jim Houghton to be the Speaker, Armstrong went against his party and nominated Bill Longeran who won the ballot to become the Speaker. It was these actions which ensured that Armstrong would not become a minister during his time in the parliament. After his retirement from the parliament he would often be seen in the gallery during proceedings.

References

Members of the Queensland Legislative Assembly
1914 births
1991 deaths
National Party of Australia members of the Parliament of Queensland
20th-century Australian politicians